This was the first edition of the tournament.

Scott Clayton and Adil Shamasdin won the title after defeating Sander Arends and Tristan-Samuel Weissborn 7–6(7–4), 5–7, [10–8] in the final.

Seeds

Draw

References
 Main draw

Teréga Open Pau-Pyrénées - Doubles